Sangtarashan cave (also known as Sangshekanan cave and Sangeshkan cave) is located in the Jahrom, in southern Iran, it is the largest handmade cave in the world. It has several corridors, columns and openings.

The cave dates back to 150 years ago and is regarded as the largest artificial cave in the world. The cave lies to the south of Jahrom.

References

Jahrom
Caves of Iran
Tourist attractions in Fars Province
Landforms of Fars Province